Raymon van Emmerik (born 11 June 1980) is a Dutch footballer.

Club career
The goalkeeper joined to Amsterdamsche FC from NEC Nijmegen. Van Emmerik made his debut in professional football, being part of the Go Ahead Eagles squad in the 2001-02 season. He also played for 1. FC Kleve before joining NEC Nijmegen.

He later moved into amateur football and played for AFC and De Dijk before joining IJsselmeervogels.

References

External links
 Profile - IJsselmeervogels

1980 births
Living people
People from Naarden
Association football goalkeepers
Dutch footballers
Go Ahead Eagles players
NEC Nijmegen players
Amsterdamsche FC players
IJsselmeervogels players
Eerste Divisie players
ASV De Dijk players
Footballers from North Holland